The ZCBJ Hall, also known as Community Hall, is a building in Haugen, Wisconsin, United States, that was built in 1910. It was listed on the National Register of Historic Places in 1985. It historically served as a meeting hall for the Czech community.

It is a  single-story frame building with a stage and with a partial basement.  It was built in three stages, the first believed to have been by the local members of the Zapadni Cesko Bratrska Jednota (ZCBJ), or Western Czech
Fraternal Union, around 1913.  It was doubled in size the next year.  A 1915 expansion added the last third of the building, including the stage and a basement, and added a new roof joining all three sections.  The first  has just a wooden foundation;  the last section has a concrete foundation.

See also
 Czech-Slovak Protective Society

References

External links
 CGSI Quarterly Meeting - September 2008

Western Fraternal Life Association
Czech-American culture in Wisconsin
Clubhouses on the National Register of Historic Places in Wisconsin
Buildings and structures in Barron County, Wisconsin
Buildings and structures completed in 1910
National Register of Historic Places in Barron County, Wisconsin
1910 establishments in Wisconsin